Altiphylax mintoni, also known commonly as Minton's thin-toed gecko or the plump swati gecko, is a species of lizard in the family Gekkonidae. The species is endemic to South Asia.

Etymology
The specific name, mintoni, is in honor of American herpetologist Sherman A. Minton.

Geographic range
A. mintoni is found in northern Pakistan.

Reproduction
A. mintoni is oviparous.

References

Further reading
Golubev ML, Sczerbak NN (1981). "[A new species of the genus Gymnodactylus Spix, 1825 (Reptilia, Sauria, Gekkonidae) from Pakistan]". Vestnik Zoologii, Kiev 1981 (3): 40–45. (Gymnodactylus mintoni, new species). (in Russian).
Khan MS (2005). "An Overview of the Angular-toed geckos of Pakistan (Squamata: Gekkonidae)". Gekko 4 (2): 20–30. 
Rösler H (2000). "Kommentierte Liste der rezent, subrezent und fossil bekannten Geckotaxa (Reptilia: Gekkonomorpha)". Gekkota 2: 28–153. (Cyrtopodion mintoni, new combination, p. 74). (in German).

Altiphylax
Reptiles described in 1981